Carmyle railway station is located in the Carmyle area of Glasgow. Train services are provided by ScotRail Trains.

History 
Carmyle station was opened in 1866 by the Rutherglen and Coatbridge Railway on their route between Coatbridge and Glasgow. The line had originally been commissioned in 1865, but for goods traffic only - passenger services started on 1 August the following year, with Carmyle opening on that date.

Both lines were operated from the outset (and eventually taken over) by the Caledonian Railway, before passing to the London, Midland and Scottish Railway at the 1923 Grouping.  They then became part of the Scottish Region of British Railways upon nationalisation in January 1948.
 
The Glasgow Central Railway line and platforms closed to passengers on 5 October 1964 as a result of the Beeching Axe. The GCR route was subsequently dismantled and few traces of it remain today (the old platforms were demolished when the M74 motorway extension was built), but the line from Rutherglen was retained for freight traffic (mainly to/from the Ravenscraig steelworks) and periodic passenger diversions. It was then reopened as the Whifflet Line with financial backing from the Strathclyde Passenger Transport Executive in 1993, with Carmyle regaining its passenger service on 4 October that year by British Rail.

Electrification of the route through the station was completed in December 2014, which was not in time for the Glasgow Commonwealth Games as originally planned. The old Diesel Multiple Unit service from Central High Level has been replaced by EMUs running via Rutherglen and the Argyle Line. This has seen the restoration of the link to Central Low Level and beyond originally lost back in 1964.

Services 
A half-hourly service operates to and from Dalmuir via Glasgow Central Low Level through to Whifflet on Mondays to Saturdays. Every second train is extended to/from Motherwell. On Sundays there is now an hourly service between Motherwell and Balloch that calls in each direction (prior to the December 2014 timetable alterations Sunday services only ran for the month prior to Christmas and were extended to/from ).

References

Notes

Sources

External links

 RAILSCOT on Glasgow Central Railway
 RAILSCOT on Rutherglen and Coatbridge Railway

Railway stations in Glasgow
SPT railway stations
Railway stations served by ScotRail
Railway stations in Great Britain opened in 1866
Railway stations in Great Britain closed in 1964
Railway stations in Great Britain opened in 1993
Former Caledonian Railway stations
Beeching closures in Scotland
1866 establishments in Scotland
Reopened railway stations in Great Britain